The Minister of Communications and Digital has been Fahmi Fadzil since 3 December 2022. The minister was supported by Deputy Minister of Communications and Digital. The minister administers the portfolio through the Ministry of Communications and Digital.

List of ministers of communications
The following individuals have been appointed as Minister of Communications, or any of its precedent titles:

Political Party:

List of ministers of digital
The following individuals have been appointed as Minister of Digital, or any of its precedent titles:

Political Party:

List of ministers of multimedia
The following individuals have been appointed as Minister of Multimedia, or any of its precedent titles:

Political Party:

List of ministers of telecommunications
The following individuals have been appointed as Minister of Telecommunications, or any of its precedent titles:

Political Party:

List of ministers of posts
The following individuals have been appointed as Minister of Posts, or any of its precedent titles:

Political Party:

List of ministers of information
The following individuals have been appointed as Minister of Information, or any of its precedent titles:

Political Party:

List of ministers of broadcasting
The following individuals have been appointed as Minister of Broadcasting, or any of its precedent titles:

Political Party:

References

Ministry of Communications and Multimedia (Malaysia)
Lists of government ministers of Malaysia
Information ministers